A thumb ring is a piece of equipment designed to protect the thumb during archery. This is a ring of leather, stone, horn, wood, bone, antler, ivory, metal, ceramics, plastic, or glass which fits over the end of the thumb, coming to rest at the outer edge of the outer joint. Typically a flat area extends from the ring to protect the pad of the thumb from the bowstring; this may be supplemented by a leather extension.

Use

When drawing a bow using a thumb draw, the thumb is hooked around the bowstring just beneath the arrow and its grip reinforced with the first (sometimes second) finger.  The bowstring rests against the inner pad of the archer's thumb and the thumb ring protects the skin.  The bowstring rests against the flat of the ring when the bow is drawn. Today, thumb rings are used by archers practicing styles from most of Asia and some regions of northern Africa. Ishi, the "last wild American Indian", used a thumb draw, but no skin protection.

Historic specimens
Thumb rings have been in use in Asia since the Neolithic period. The first examples were likely made of leather, but artifacts made entirely of leather do not last thousands of years. Surviving artifact rings are made of bone, horn, or stone; presumably most would have incorporated a leather guard. Comparison with historical and modern rings shows little functional change over the millennia. In the cemetery of the small Rui state at Liangdaicun near Hancheng on the Yellow River (where it flows south between the provinces of Shaanxi and Shanxi), a Lord of Rui was interred in a tomb, M 27, dated to the eighth century BCE. His grave goods included two thumb rings, made of gold but of an entirely modern pattern.

The author of "Arab Archery" refers to rings as being usually made of leather. A "thumb tip" or "thumb ring" which is called "kustubān" by the Persian and "khayta‘ah" by the Arabs, consists of a ring of leather or some other material. It is worn over the right thumb, leaving the nail and knuckle exposed, and is used for the protection of the thumb against injuries which are usually caused by the string when it is drawn and released." Possibly, most ordinary archers historically used tabs of leather, much cheaper and easier to make, but such rings are not likely to survive. Metal thumb rings of silver or bronze were thought to be too inflexible in use, and thus were less accurate.

Many surviving historic thumbrings are hardstone carvings in jade and other gemstones, or are made of precious metal. Most are very practical but some have the release surface so ornamented as to be unusable. The rings could be displayed on a cord from the belt, or, in China, in a special box.  In the 16th century court of the Ottoman Empire they had the extra function of being "used when executing disgraced officials to tighten a handkerchief wound round the throat".

Variants

In territories of the Qing dynasty, Manchurian cylindrical thumb rings gradually displaced more thumb pad shaped thumb rings. These cylindrical thumb rings would go over the primary thumb joint, hooking the draw string around the base of the cylinder.

Gallery

References

External links

 A collection of thumbrings at the University of Missouri Museum of Anthropology 
 How do I use a Thumb-ring with a Mongolian Draw?
 Making a thumbring from a billiard ball
 Ancient Chinese thumb rings, Shang Dynasty to Han Dynasty 
 On using cylindrical Chinese / Manchu style thumb rings
 - German language chinese archery site: Containing the kind, form, material and use of chinese / manchuraian thumb rings
 The Art of Shooting a Short Reflexed Bow with a Thumb Ring. 2012. By Adam Swoboda. Gdynia Press.

Archery
Rings (jewellery)
History of archery